The Gabela bushshrike (Laniarius amboimensis) or Amboim bushshrike is a bird in the family Malaconotidae. It is a reclusive and enigmatic bird, and it is not quite resolved whether it should better be considered a distinct species or a well-marked subspecies of Lühder's bushshrike. It is endemic to Angola.

Its natural habitat is subtropical or tropical moist montane forests. It is threatened by habitat loss.

References

Gabela bushshrike
Endemic birds of Angola
Gabela bushshrike
Taxonomy articles created by Polbot